Austria has participated in the biennial classical music competition Eurovision Young Musicians 18 times since its debut in 1982 and is the most successful country in the contest, with a total of five wins. Austria has hosted the contest a record six times, in 1990, 1998, 2006, 2008, 2010 and 2012.

On 29 October 2015, the Austrian broadcaster Österreichischer Rundfunk (ORF) informed Eurovoix.com that they would withdraw from the event in 2016. Austria last participated at the 2014 Young Musicians, which they won. However, on 11 January 2016 it was announced that Austria would compete in the 2016 contest. ORF decided to withdraw from the 2018 edition, after participating at every previous edition of the contest, with no reasons for their withdrawal being published. On 21 February 2022, it was confirmed that Austria would return to the competition.

Participation overview

Hostings

See also
Austria in the Eurovision Song Contest
Austria in the Eurovision Dance Contest
Austria in the Eurovision Young Dancers

References

External links 
 Eurovision Young Musicians

Countries in the Eurovision Young Musicians